Eric Jean-Paul Urban is a professor of mathematics at Columbia University working in number theory and automorphic forms, particularly Iwasawa theory.

Career
Urban received his PhD in mathematics from Paris-Sud University in 1994 under the supervision of Jacques Tilouine. He is a professor of mathematics at Columbia University.

Research
Together with Christopher Skinner, Urban proved many cases of Iwasawa–Greenberg main conjectures for a large class of modular forms. As a consequence, for a modular elliptic curve over the rational numbers, they prove that the vanishing of the Hasse–Weil L-function L(E, s) of E at s = 1 implies that the p-adic Selmer group of E is infinite. Combined with theorems of Gross-Zagier and Kolyvagin, this gave a conditional proof (on the Tate–Shafarevich conjecture) of the conjecture that E has infinitely many rational points if and only if L(E, 1) =  0, a (weak) form of the Birch–Swinnerton-Dyer conjecture. These results were used (in joint work with Manjul Bhargava and Wei Zhang) to prove that a positive proportion of elliptic curves satisfy the Birch–Swinnerton-Dyer conjecture.

Awards
Urban was awarded a Guggenheim Fellowship in 2007.

Selected publications

References

External links
 

20th-century French mathematicians
21st-century French mathematicians
Number theorists
Living people
Date of birth missing (living people)
Place of birth missing (living people)
Columbia University faculty
University of Paris alumni
Year of birth missing (living people)